Tom Calvert, better known by his stage name Redinho, is an English multi-instrumentalist, vocalist, and producer from London. Calvert produced Swet Shop Boys' debut album Cashmere and Sufi LA, and performed with them on The Late Show with Stephen Colbert in New York, and directed their live performance on BBC Radio 1. Calvert was also the member of Hudson Mohawke's live band on the Lantern album campaign, and produced Riz Ahmed's 2020 album The Long Goodbye.

Career

In 2010 Calvert began working with UK dance record label Numbers under the alias Redinho, releasing his beat tape Bare Blips. Under Redinho, Calvert became well known for his talkbox and synthesizer live shows, and his 2011 Numbers release "Stay Together". Calvert toured as Redinho, playing at major venues and festivals worldwide including SXSW, Primavera, and Sónar. He also collaborated with Rustie and rapper 100s. He released the single "Searching" on Numbers in 2013. Notable fans within the industry at the time included Hudson Mohawke.

Calvert's full length album Redinho was released on Numbers in September 2014. Dazed called it "a debut album ... ecstatically full of life and colour." The album included vocal contributions from Brendan Reilly, Vula, and Vanessa Haynes.

During 2015 and 2016, Calvert became the member of Hudson Mohawke's live band for his Lantern album campaign. During a BBC Radio 1 Maida Vale Live Session,  Calvert was also interviewed by radio DJ Annie Mac through a talkbox.

In 2017, under his own name, Calvert released a beat tape titled Zanbor, accompanied by a film made by filmmaker and producer Abdullah Al-wali.

In early 2018, Calvert released "Square 1" featuring Kimbra. Calvert also produced "Sweet Relief" for Kimbra in 2016.

In 2018, Calvert won international artist grants from the Arts Council and the PRS Foundation Momentum Fund, and was awarded the British Council's Musicians In Residence and worked in Fortaleza, Brazil.

In March 2019, Calvert released "Snake Skin Boots" featuring LA rapper Blimes on Roya. This single, as well as another single Calvert released, "Mmm Mmm" a year before in March 2018, also on Roya, were both consecutively crowned Annie Mac's "Hottest Record In The World" on BBC Radio 1.

In August 2019, Calvert released "Nova Special" on Roya Records. The single's video was shot in Athens, Greece.

In October 2019, Calvert released "Sheriff" featuring South London singer Joel Culpepper.

In March 2020, Riz Ahmed's album The Long Goodbye was released, an album produced entirely by Calvert. The Guardian wrote that "The Long Goodbye’s main currency is pointed blasts of sound, where rattling percussion and samples of traditional Indian and Pakistani instruments and singing, the latter frequently looped into insistent, hypnotic motifs, clash against bursts of harshly distorted electronics. On occasion, it slips into more commercial territory – Karma has a hint of tropical house about it, Deal With It has an impressively hooky pop melody – or something that sounds suspiciously like musical satire: Jay Sean’s appearance on Any Day repurposes Drake’s Auto-Tuned solipsism for socio-political ends. But its most thrilling moments are its harshest: the frantic Fast Lava, the scourging, stammering eruptions of Toba Tek Singh."

Calvert released his second notable album as Redinho, Finally We're Alone, in July 2021. The atmospheric and emotional body of work was a personal snapshot in time made during the 2020 pandemic, rooted in electronic music, beats, and 80s VHS nostalgia, all written, produced and performed by Redinho himself. The album was received favourably in the press, with Loud and Quiet magazine calling it "an immensely delicate and vulnerable record" that "truthfully captures the turbulent emotions universally felt during lockdown."

Discography

Studio albums
 Redinho (2014)
 Zanbor (2017) 
SunnyVale (2020)
Finally We're Alone (2021)

EPs
 Bare Blips EP (2010)
 Edge Off EP (2011)

Singles
 "Stay Together" (2011)
 "Searching" (2013)
 "Square 1" (2018) (featuring Kimbra)
 "Mmm Mmm" (2018)
 "Snake Skin Boots" (2019) 
 "Nova Special" (2019)
"Sheriff" (2019) (with Joel Culpepper)
"Bullet" (2021) (featuring Sans Soucis)

Guest appearances
 100s – "Ten Freaky Hoes" from Ivry (2014)
 Rustie – "Lost" from Green Language (2014)

Productions
 Kimbra – "Sweet Relief" (2016)
 Bonzai – "2B" and "Bodhran" from Lunacy (2016)
 Swet Shop Boys – Cashmere (2016)
 Swet Shop Boys – Sufi La (2017)
 Riz Ahmed - The Long Goodbye (2020)

Remixes
 Dorian Concept – "Clap Track 4 (Redinho Remix)" (2015)
 Fatima Yamaha – "Love Invaders (Redinho Remix)" (2016)
 Breakbot – "Get Lost (Redinho Remix)" (2016)
 Hypnolove – "Marbella (Redinho Version)" (2019)

References

External links
 Redinho on Numbers
 
 

Musicians from London
Living people
Year of birth missing (living people)